The women's individual pursuit at the 2009 Dutch National Track Championships in Alkmaar took place at Sportpaleis Alkmaar on October 10, 2009. 10 athletes participated in the contest.

Kirsten Wild won the gold medal, Vera Koedooder took silver and Amy Pieters won the bronze.

Preview
Titleholder Ellen van Dijk took not part in this competition. Two weeks before the national championships she rode the time trial at the Road World Championships. Van Dijk wanted to take some rest in preparation for the qualification moment for the Track World Championships during the World Cup competitions in November.

Competition format
The tournament started with a qualifying round. The two fastest qualifiers advanced to the gold medal final. The numbers three and four competed against each other for the bronze medal.

Race
Kirsten Wild rode in the qualification round with 3:44 the fastest time, a second faster than the number two Vera Koedooder. In the gold medal match, Kirsten wild rode more than 2 seconds faster than Vera Koedooder.

Final results

Results from uci.ch

References

2009 Dutch National track cycling championships
Dutch National Track Championships – Women's individual pursuit
Dutch